Family law (also called matrimonial law or the law of domestic relations) is an area of the law that deals with family matters and domestic relations.

Overview
Subjects that commonly fall under a nation's body of family law include:
 Marriage, civil unions, and domestic partnerships:
 Entry into legally recognized spousal and domestic relationships
 The termination of legally recognized family relationships and ancillary matters, including divorce, annulment, property settlements, alimony, child custody and visitation, child support and alimony awards
Prenuptial and Postnuptial agreements
 Adoption: proceedings to adopt a child and, in some cases, an adult.
 Surrogacy: the law and process of giving birth as a surrogate mother
  Child protective proceedings: court proceedings that may result from state intervention in cases of child abuse and child neglect
 Juvenile law: Matters relating to minors including status offenses, delinquency, emancipation and juvenile adjudication
 Paternity: proceedings to establish and disestablish paternity, and the administration of paternity testing

This list is not exhaustive and varies depending on jurisdiction.

Conflict of laws

Issues may arise in family law where there is a question as to the laws of the jurisdiction that apply to the marriage relationship or to custody and divorce, and whether a divorce or child custody order is recognized under the laws of another jurisdiction. For child custody, many nations have joined the Hague Convention on the Civil Aspects of International Child Abduction in order to grant recognition to other member states' custody orders and avoid issues of parental kidnapping.

See also

Specific jurisdictions

References

Further reading

External links
 Testimony of Barbara Dafoe Whitehead, Ph.D., Co-Director, National Marriage Project Rutgers University, before US Senate Subcommittee
  (an analysis of the long-term effect of divorce on children)
 R. Partain, "Comparative Family Law, Korean Family Law, and the Missing Definitions of Family", (2012) HongIk University Journal of Law, Vol. 13, No. 2.
"Hong Kong Family Court Tables" includes a summary of Hong Kong family law principles, a guide to the recent case law and relevant statutes, and a glossary of relevant terms related to the Hong Kong family law.

 
Divorce
Marriage